
Gmina Charsznica is a rural gmina (administrative district) in Miechów County, Lesser Poland Voivodeship, in southern Poland.

Villages
Gmina Charsznica contains the villages and settlements of Charsznica, Chodów, Ciszowice, Dąbrowiec, Jelcza, Marcinkowice, Podlesice, Pogwizdów, Swojczany, Szarkówka, Tczyca, Uniejów-Kolonia, Uniejów-Parcela, Uniejów-Rędziny, Wierzbie and Witowice.

Neighbouring gminas
Gmina Charsznica is bordered by the gminas of Gołcza, Kozłów, Książ Wielki, Miechów, Wolbrom and Żarnowiec.

References
Polish official population figures 2006

Charsznica
Miechów County